The Obtectomera is a clade of macro-moths and butterflies, comprising over 100,000 species in at least 12 superfamilies.

Taxonomy

The Obtectomera includes the following 12 superfamilies:
 Whalleyanoidea Minet, 1991 
 Thyridoidea Herrich-Schäffer, 1846 – picture-winged leaf moths
 Hyblaeoidea Hampson, 1903 – teak moths
 Calliduloidea Moore, 1877 –  Old World butterfly-moths
 Papilionoidea Latreille, 1802 – true butterflies
 Pyraloidea Latreille, 1809 – pyraloid moths
 Mimallonoidea Burmeister, 1878 – sack bearers (sometimes included Macroheterocera)
 Macroheterocera Chapman, 1893 
 Drepanoidea Boisduval, 1828 – drepanids
 Noctuoidea Latreille, 1809 – owlet moths
 Geometroidea Leach, 1815 – inchworms
 Lasiocampoidea Harris, 1841 – lappet moths
 Bombycoidea Latreille, 1802 – bombycoid moths

Some other superfamilies are sometimes included:

 Pterophoroidea Latreille, 1802 – plume moths
 Alucitoidea Leach, 1815 – many-plume moths
 Copromorphoidea [=Carposinoidea] Walsingham, 1897 – fruitworm moths
 Epermenioidea Spuler, 1910 – fringe-tufted moths
 Gelechioidea Stainton, 1854 – case-bearers, twirler moths, curved-horn moths, etc.

The macroheteroceran superfamilies were previously place in the Macrolepidoptera, but recent molecular studies have failed to recover the Macrolepidoptera as a monophyletic group. The latter grouping also included true butterflies (Papilionoidea), New World butterfly-moths (Hedylidae), Old World butterfly-moths (Calliduloidea), and European gold moths (Axioidea).

References

 
Ditrysia